Qermez Cheshmeh is a village in Talkh Ab Rural District, Khenejin District, Farahan County, Markazi Province, Iran. At the 2006 census, its population was 114, in 43 families.

References 

Populated places in Farahan County